The North Carolina Pre-Flight Cloudbusters represented the U.S. Navy pre-flight school at the University of North Carolina at Chapel Hill in the college football seasons of 1942, 1943 and 1944 during World War II. The North Carolina Pre-Flight School was established on February 1, 1942, by the Secretary of the Navy and opened that April. The football team was later organized and competed against other military teams in addition to major college teams of the period. During their three years in existence, the Cloudbusters compiled an overall record of sixteen wins, eight losses and three ties (16–8–3).

North Carolina Pre-Flight was coached by one of Notre Dame's former "Four Horsemen" and Fordham head coach Jim Crowley in 1942 and went 8–2–1. The Cloudbusters were coached by former Baylor head coach Frank Kimbrough in 1943 and went 2–4–1. In 1944, they were led by Glenn Killinger and went 6–2–1. The Cloudbusters were also known for having both future College Football Hall of Fame inductees Johnny Vaught and Bear Bryant serve as assistant coaches in 1942 and 1944 respectively. Vaught went on to coach at Ole Miss, and while there won the 1960 national championship and compiled an overall record of 190 wins, 61 losses and 12 ties (190–61–12). Bryant went on to coach at Maryland, Kentucky, Texas A&M and Alabama, and during his career won the 1961, 1964, 1965, 1973, 1978 and 1979 national championships and compiled an overall record of 323 wins, 85 losses and 17 ties (323–85–17).

1942 season

The 1942 Cloudbusters squad was led by former Fordham head coach Jim Crowley. Members of Crowley's staff included: Charles R. Soleau as backs coach, Ed Sosky as ends coach, and George McGaughey, N. J. Pierce and Johnny Vaught as line coaches. The squad finished the season with an overall record of eight wins, two losses and one tie (8–2–1).

After the Cloudbusters opened the season with a 13–2 victory over Catawba, they traveled to Boston and shutout Harvard 13–0 before 7,000 fans. After a tie against Georgia Pre-Flight and a victory against NC State, the Cloudbusters lost their first game of the season against Boston College 7–6. Following their loss against the Eagles, they ran for 272 yards in a 34–0 victory over Temple before 20,000 fans at Philadelphia. The Cloudbusters would then only allow seven points over the next four games leading to their season finale against Crowley's former school, Fordham. Before 24,500 fans at Yankee Stadium, the Cadets were upset 6–0 in a defensive struggle with the only points of the game coming on a Steve Filipowicz touchdown run in the first half.

Games against both Colgate and Iowa Pre-Flight included in the original schedule were canceled by the end of the season.

1943 season

The 1943 Cloudbusters squad was led by former Baylor head coach Frank Kimbrough. The squad finished the season with an overall record of two wins, four losses and one tie (2–4–1). The Cadets opened their 1943 season with a pair of shutout losses. The first was a 31–0 loss to Navy before 12,231 at Thompson Stadium in Annapolis, and the second was a 42–0 loss to Duke in Durham. The Cloudbusters rebounded with a victory over Camp Davis only to lose their next two contests. The squad then finished the season with a tie against Camp Lejeune and a 21–7 victory over NC State.

The game against Virginia Tech at Victory Stadium in Roanoke, Virginia included in the original schedule was canceled by the end of the season.

1944 season

The 1944 Cloudbusters squad was led by head coach Glenn Killinger. Members of Killinger's staff included: Glenn Presnell as backs coach, John Roning as ends coach, and Bear Bryant as line coach. The squad finished the season with an overall record of six wins, two losses and one tie (6–2–1).

The cadets opened the season with a 27–14 victory over Cherry Point MCAS, and the next week upset national championship favorite Navy before 10,000 fans at Annapolis. In the victory over the Midshipmen, Otto Graham threw a lateral pass to Frank Aschenbrenner who ran it 55-yards for the game-winning score. The next week, the squad defeated Duke 13–6 for a second consecutive upset. As a result of these upsets, the Cloudbusters earned the No. 2 ranking in the first AP Poll of the 1944 season.

After being held to a tie against Virginia, the Cloudbusters rebounded with a 3–0 victory over  after Buell St. John connected on a short field goal with only seven seconds remaining in the game. After a victory over, the cadets suffered their first loss of the season in a 49–20 loss against Bainbridge NTS. The Cloudbusters responded the following week with a 33–18 victory over Georgia Pre-Flight, with Graham throwing for three touchdowns and running for one in the contest. The cadets then finished the season with a loss against Camp Peary.

1945 season
The 1945 Cloudbusters squad was to have been led by head coach Bear Bryant. However, Bryant never served as the head coach at Carolina after the Navy dropped the football program there in August 1945. From the Cloudbusters, Bryant took the head coaching position with Maryland, and fourteen players he coached at the Pre-Flight School enrolled to play for him at Maryland after they were discharged from the service.

References